Scopula ocellata is a moth of the  family Geometridae. It is found on Sumbawa, Sumatra and Java.

References

Moths described in 1899
ocellata
Moths of Asia